D.A.D. Draws a Circle is the second studio album by Danish rock band D-A-D, at the time known as Disneyland After Dark. It was released on 16 June 1987 by Mega Records. The album received fairly positive reviews and sold 30,000 copies in Denmark.

The album was produced by Englishman Mark Dearnley, who had engineered for acts like AC/DC, Motörhead, the Beat and Haircut One Hundred. The album title has a dual meaning: it refers to making an album and, also, signals that the band had come full circle while covering different musical styles such as hard rock, punk, country, and gospel. 
 
The album contains D-A-D's first and only cover version, "A Horse with No Name" by America, at the request of producer Mark Dearnley.

Track listing

Personnel
Adapted from the album's liner notes, except where noted.
Disneyland After Dark
Jesper Binzer – vocals, guitar
Stig Pedersen – vocals, bass
Jacob Binzer – guitar, lap steel, electric piano
Peter L. Jensen – drums, backing vocals
Technical
Mark Dearnley – producer, engineer, mixing
First Floor – cover art 
Robin Skjoldborg – photography

References

External links
This album on D-A-D's official homepage

1987 albums
D.A.D. (band) albums